John George Smyth JP DL MP (5 February 1815 – 10 June 1869) was a Conservative member of Parliament for the City of York from August 28, 1847 to July 11, 1865.

Smyth was the eldest son of John Henry Smyth (1780–1822), of  Heath Hall, Wakefield, Yorkshire, a Whig MP for Cambridge University (1812–1822) and Lady Elizabeth Anne FitzRoy, daughter of George FitzRoy, 4th Duke of Grafton. His younger brother, Henry Smyth, was an Army officer and the grandfather of Sir John Smyth, 1st Baronet, recipient of the Victoria Cross.

Smyth married the Honourable Diana Bosville Macdonald (12 April 1812 – 8 December 1880), daughter of Godfrey Macdonald, 3rd Baron Macdonald of Sleat, on 25 April 1837. They had four daughters.

References

External links

 

1869 deaths
Members of the Parliament of the United Kingdom for English constituencies
UK MPs 1852–1857
1815 births
Politicians from York
UK MPs 1847–1852
UK MPs 1857–1859
UK MPs 1859–1865